Monodiplos is a traditional dance from the area of Messenia in the Peloponnese. The dance is typically a Kalamatiano dance with two variations. There is a single step and a double step back variation that occurs in the dance.  The song typically used in this dance is "Stin Apano Geitonia". This is cited in Evangelos Lambpropoulos research called "Horoi apo Messiniaki Gis" (2009) in Greek, Dances of Messenia. 

Greek dances